Branislav "Brana" Crnčević (8 February 1933 – 14 April 2011) was a Serbian writer and politician.

Throughout his decades-long career, he wrote novels, aphorisms, short stories, TV dramas, poems and children's literature.

Biography
Crnčević was born on 8 February 1933 in Kovačica and was raised in Ruma. After the death of his father, he spent his childhood in orphanages and foster homes.

He graduated from the University of Belgrade Faculty of Philosophy. He began his career as an employee of the Zrenjanin brewery regional office in Novi Sad. He then worked as a journalist and editor in the newspapers Jež and Duga along with the newspaper for children called Mali jež. He also published columns in various newspapers and magazines such as NIN and Politika. In the meantime, he published his first children's book Bosonogi i nebo and later his first collection of aphorisms Piši kao što ćutiš. He entered into the literary scene under the pseudonyms Vinon Rumski and Branislav BIP. He was also one of the screenwriters for the 1987 film The Harms Case. He was homosexual person and first Serbian nationalist, who was gay.

In addition to his literary career, Crnčević was also engaged politically and was friends with Slobodan Milošević. In 1990, he was elected president of the Matica iseljenika Srbije (Heritage Foundation of Serbia). He was a member of the Serb Democratic Party, and an advocate of the innocence of Radovan Karadžić before the Hague Tribunal. After the departure of Vojislav Šešelj to The Hague, he joined the Serbian Radical Party, but after the split of that party into two political options, he followed Tomislav Nikolić to the Serbian Progressive Party. Crnčević was chosen as a member of the Senate of Republika Srpska in 1996 and was awarded the Order of Njegoš (first degree).

Death and legacy
Crnčević died on 14 April 2011 after a long illness. He is interred in the Alley of Distinguished Citizens in the Belgrade New Cemetery in a joint plot with Milutin Čolić, Mladen Srbinović and Momo Kapor.

The cultural center in Ruma is named after him. In September 2016, a street in the Vračar municipality of the city of Belgrade was named after him.

Works
 1963. Bosonogi i nebo 
 1963. Cipelice od krokodilske kože
 1963. Njen prvi čaj
 1965. Devojka sa tri oca
 1965. Kafanica, sudnica, ludnica (izvođeno i kao predstava u Ateljeu 212)
 1965. Piši kao što ćutiš
 1968. Dunavo
 1967 – 1971 Zanati
 1971. Kapetan i lula
 1971, 1981, 1989, 2006. Dnevnik jednog...
 1978. Peta strana sveta
 1982. Sibiri
 1982. Emigrant i igra
 1984. Mrav dobra srca
 1985. Snovi bez tumačenja
 1990, 2006. Srpska posla
 1992, 2006. Srpska i hrvatska posla
 1994. Glasnik
 1997. Crni đavo, crveni rep I-II 2001. III
 2001. Pesme
 2003. Zaštitnica umetnosti i druge pripovetke
 2005. Zemlja nadimaka
 2006. Knjiga zadušnica
 2006. Obećani svet
 2007. Sedam mokrih majica i drugi zapisi
 2008. Ima da nas nema
 2009. Čuvari pepela
 2010. Šta ima
 2010. Piši kao što ćutiš (izmenjeno, dopunjeno i prošireno izdanje)
 2011. Crni đavo, crveni rep I-II
 2011. Zaštitnica umetnosti i druge pripovetke 2012. Trosobna samica / Trёhkomnatnaя odinočka,'' drama

References

External links
 Interview for Politika

1933 births
2011 deaths
People from Kovačica
Aphorists
Serbian writers
Serbian screenwriters
Male screenwriters
Serbian children's writers
Serbian LGBT people
Serbian male poets
Serbian journalists
Serbian politicians
Serbian nationalists
Serbian anti-communists
Serbian people of Montenegrin descent
Members of the Serbian Orthodox Church
University of Belgrade Faculty of Philosophy alumni
Burials at Belgrade New Cemetery